The 2021 CAF Women's Champions League WAFU Zone A Qualifiers is the 1st edition of the WAFU Zone A women's club football qualifier tournament organised by the WAFU for the women's clubs of association nations. This edition was held from 24 to 30 July 2021 in Mindelo, Cape Verde. The winners of the tournament qualified for the 2021 CAF Women's Champions League final tournament held in Egypt.

Participating teams
The following four teams contested in the qualifying tournament.

Match officials

Referees
 Aïssata Lam (Mauritania)  
 Mame Coumba Faye  (Senegal) 
 Isatou Touray  (Gambia)
 Rokiatou Fofana  (Mali) 
 Felicité Kourouma (Guinea) 

Assistant Referees
 Abbie Leesay (Gambia) 
 Jainaba Manneh (Gambia) 
 Mariem Chedad  (Mauritania) 
 Houleye Diba (Mauritania) 
 Fatou Binetou Sène (Senegal) 
 Fanta Kone  (Mali) 
 Fantagbè Kaba (Guinea) 
 Evandra Furtado (Cape Verde)

Qualifying tournament

Awards and statistics

Goalscorers

Best player
 Fatoumata Diarra

Best goalkeeper
 Aïssatou Diallo

Fairplay team
 Seven Stars

References

External links 
2021 CAF Women's Champions League WAFU Zone A Qualifiers - cafonline.org

2021 CAF Women's Champions League
Women's Champions League
CAF